Crișan may refer to several places in Romania:

Crișan, Tulcea, a commune in Tulcea County
Crișan, Satu Mare, a residential district in Satu Mare municipality
Crișan, a village in Crucea Commune, Constanța County
Crișan, a village in Ribița Commune, Hunedoara County
Crișan, a tributary of the Chichirgeaua in Constanța County
Hilișeu-Crișan, a village in Hilișeu-Horia Commune, Botoșani County

And to 

 Crișan, a leader of the Revolt of Horea, Cloșca and Crișan

Other 
 Crișan (surname)

See also 
 Criș (disambiguation)
 Crișana (disambiguation)